Nong Sang railway station is a railway station located in Ban Na Subdistrict, Kabin Buri District, Prachinburi Province.

References 

Railway stations in Thailand
Prachinburi province